The 2010 BNP Paribas Primrose Bordeaux was a professional tennis tournament played on outdoor red clay courts. It was part of the 2010 ATP Challenger Tour. It took place in Bordeaux, France between May 10 and May 16, 2010.

Entrants

Seeds

 Rankings are as of May 3, 2010.

Other entrants
The following players received wildcards into the singles main draw:
  Thierry Ascione
  David Guez
  Nicolas Mahut
  Laurent Rochette

The following players received entry from the qualifying draw:
  José Checa-Calvo
  Benoît Paire
  Olivier Patience
  Caio Zampieri

The following player received special exempt into the main draw:
  Albert Ramos-Viñolas

Champions

Singles

 Richard Gasquet def.  Michaël Llodra, 4–6, 6–1, 6–4

Doubles

 Nicolas Mahut /  Édouard Roger-Vasselin def.  Karol Beck /  Leoš Friedl, 5–7, 6–3, [10–7]

External links
Official website
ITF search 

BNP Paribas Primrose Bordeaux
2010 in French tennis
BNP Paribas Primrose Bordeaux